The Wilderness Road was one of two principal routes used by colonial and early national era settlers to reach Kentucky from the East. Although this road goes through the Cumberland Gap into southern Kentucky and northern Tennessee, the other (more northern route) is sometimes called the "Cumberland Road" because it started in Fort Cumberland in Maryland. Despite Kentucky Senator Henry Clay's advocacy of this route, early in the 19th century, the northern route was selected for the National Road, connecting near Washington, Pennsylvania into the Ohio Valley of northern Kentucky and Ohio.

In 1775, Daniel Boone blazed a trail for the Transylvania Company from Fort Chiswell in Virginia through the Cumberland Gap. It was later lengthened, following Indian trails, to reach the Falls of the Ohio at Louisville. The Wilderness Road was steep, rough and narrow, and could be traversed only on foot or horseback. By contrast, wagons could travel along the National Road route (originally the Braddock Road blazed by the competing Ohio Company and George Washington circa 1750), particularly after the improvements.

Despite the adverse conditions, thousands of families used the Wilderness Road. In 1792, the new Kentucky legislature provided money to upgrade the road. In 1796, an improved all-weather road was opened for wagon and carriage travel. The road was abandoned around 1840 (construction on the National Road after Vandalia, Illinois also stopping owing to the Panic of 1837 and early railroad construction), although modern highways follow much of its route.

Early exploration
The first European explorers of the southern Appalachian Mountains were Spanish.  Hernando de Soto and his troops traversed the region in 1540 and 1541 searching for gold.

The first recorded English explorations of the mountains were those of Abraham Wood, which began around 1650. Later, Wood sent exploring parties into the mountains. The Batts-Fallam expedition reached the New River Valley in 1671.  In 1673, Wood sent Gabriel Arthur and James Needham to the Overhill Cherokee of modern Tennessee.  The purpose was to try to make direct contact with the Cherokee for trade, so as to circumvent the Ocaneechee "middlemen" traders.

The expedition did reach the Overhill Cherokee area, but Needham was killed on the return trip.  Gabriel Arthur was almost killed, but was rescued and adopted by a Cherokee chief.  For his own safety, Arthur was then sent with one of the chief's raiding parties.  For about a year, he traveled with the Cherokee throughout the Appalachians.  He was probably the first European to visit modern West Virginia and cross the Cumberland Gap.
 
In 1750, Dr. Thomas Walker, an investor in the Loyal Land Company, with five companions, made a famous exploration through the Cumberland Gap and into eastern Kentucky.  The Loyal Land Company settled people in southwest Virginia, but not Kentucky.

In 1769, Virginia longhunter and explorer Joseph Martin made the first of several forays into the region. Acting as an agent for Dr. Thomas Walker, to whom Martin was connected through family relationships, Martin began an expedition to Powell's Valley in early 1769 in return for a promised  land grant from Walker and the Loyal Land Company. Martin and his men built the earliest westernmost frontier fort at present-day Rose Hill, Virginia, a fort dubbed Martin's Station. Later that year Indians chased off Martin and his men, who returned to Albemarle County. Martin returned six years later to rebuild the fort, and a few months later became an agent for Richard Henderson's Transylvania Company.

In 1774, Richard Henderson, a judge from North Carolina, organized a land speculation company with a number of other prominent North Carolinians called the Transylvania Company. The men hoped to purchase land from the Cherokees on the Kentucky side of the Appalachian Mountains and establish a British proprietary colony. Henderson hired Daniel Boone, an experienced hunter who had explored Kentucky, to blaze a trail through the Cumberland Gap into central Kentucky.

Boone, the trailblazer

The Appalachian Mountains form a natural barrier to east–west travel. From New York to Georgia there are only five ways to travel to the west, with only three natural interior breaks allowing animal powered travel without great engineering works. These were the Gaps of the Allegheny and the several ways such as the Kittanning Paths in Pennsylvania, the Cumberland Narrows in northwestern Maryland host to Nemacolin's Path, and the Cumberland Gap in the four-state region of North Carolina and Virginia on the east side and through the gap, Tennessee and Kentucky.

While late 19th and 20th century technologies would later bridge the mountain chain in other places, these all required significant civil engineering works to make a road bed past the barrier range geologist classify as the ridge-and-valley Appalachians. Settlers from Pennsylvania tended to migrate south along the Great Wagon Road through the Great Appalachian Valley and Shenandoah Valley.
  
Daniel Boone was from Pennsylvania and migrated south with his family along this road. From an early age, Boone was one of the longhunters who hunted and trapped among the Native American nations along the western frontiers of Virginia, so-called because of the long time they spent away from home on hunts in the wilderness. Boone would sometimes be gone for months and even years before returning home from his hunting expeditions.

Boone recommended three essentials for a pioneer: "A good gun, a good horse, and a good wife."  He also would need a strong body, a sharp ax and good luck.  Another essential was salt. Before 1776, it had to be shipped into the Thirteen Colonies from the West Indies at great expense.  It was the only meat preservative available for men on the move and Kentucky had an extra lure with its large salt brine lakes near what is today the community of Boonesborough, Kentucky. The many "salt licks" of Kentucky are today reflected in the many place names in the state that use the words "lick" or "licking".
 
Starting on March 10, 1775 Boone, along with 35 axmen, cut a trail from Long Island in Kingsport, Tennessee through the forests and mountains to Kentucky. It was a rough mud trail, hardly more than a path. The Transylvania Company had obtained title to Kentucky from the Cherokee and Iroquois, and even the Shawnee chief Cornstalk, defeated in Dunmore's War, had promised at the Treaty of Camp Charlotte on October 19, 1774 that his tribe would no longer hunt or claim land south of the Ohio River in Kentucky.

Notwithstanding this promise, the Shawnee viewed Boone and other settlers as invaders. On March 24, 1775 Boone and his party were only  from their final destination of the Kentucky River when they camped for the night. Just before daybreak a group of Shawnee, slinging tomahawks, attacked the sleeping men. Some of Boone's party were killed and a few were wounded but most were able to escape into the woods. Boone regrouped his men and managed to drive off the hostile Shawnee. The party lost some of their horses.

By the next year, the Shawnee had been joined by the Chickamauga Cherokee in the Cherokee–American wars with the settlers, which lasted until 1794.

Route

From the Long Island of the Holston River (modern Kingsport, Tennessee), the road went north through Moccasin Gap of Clinch Mountain, then crossed the Clinch River and crossed rough land (called the Devils Raceway) to the North Fork Clinch River.  Then it crossed Powell Mountain at Kanes Gap.  From there it ran southwest through the valley of the Powell River to the Cumberland Gap.

After passing over the Cumberland Gap the Wilderness Road forked.  The southern fork passed over the Cumberland Plateau to Nashville, Tennessee via the Cumberland River. The northern fork split into two parts.  The eastern spur went into the Bluegrass region of Kentucky to Boonesborough on the Kentucky River (near Lexington).  The western spur ran to the Falls of the Ohio (Louisville). As settlements grew southward, the road stretched all the way to Knoxville, Tennessee, by 1792.

Dangers

Because of the threat of Native American attacks, the road was so dangerous that most pioneers traveled well armed. Robbers and criminals also could be found on the road, ready to pounce on weaker pioneers.  Although the Transylvania Company had purchased the region from the Cherokee, and the Iroquois had ceded it at the Treaty of Fort Stanwix, other tribes, such as the Shawnee, still claimed it and lived there.
 
Often entire communities and church congregations would move together over the road to new settlements.  Hundreds of pioneers were killed by Indian attacks.

Defensive log blockhouses built alongside the road had portholes in the walls for firing at Native American attackers. They were often called "stations".  No one knew exactly when the next attack would happen. The Shawnee came from the north, while the Chickamauga (Cherokees who rejected the land sale treaty) came from the south. The tribes were resentful of the settlers taking their ancestral hunting lands, and the French and Indian War had further stirred up their passions against the white man.

There was a great variety of animal life in the wilderness. At night, the pioneers could hear the hoots and screeches of owls, the howls of wolves, and the cries of panthers and wild cats. Sometimes the Native Americans imitated these sounds. Venomous snakes such as copperheads and rattlesnakes blended into the leaves and undergrowth and were a danger to the pioneers, their horses and cattle.

Settlement

On March 28, 1775, he left Long Island (Kingsport, Tennessee) with about 30 horsemen on the grueling trip down the Wilderness Road to Kentucky. At Martin's Station 40 to 50 additional pioneers joined the venture. On their way, they met nearly a hundred refugees fleeing Native American attacks further down the road.

Despite the danger, the party kept going toward Kentucky. Since some of the streams were flooded, the pioneers had to swim with their horses. On April 20, they arrived at Boonesborough, a fortified town, named by Judge Henderson in honor of Boone.
 
After 1770, a surge of over 400,000 Scots-Irish immigrants arrived in the colonies to escape the poor harvest, high rents and religious intolerance of Ulster. Since the better lands had already been taken, they constantly pressed onward to the western frontier of the foothills of the Carolinas.

The flood of Scots-Irish, German, and others immigrants kept coming. Over 200,000 pioneers came over the Wilderness Road, enduring severe hardships. In the winter of 1778-79, the weather was so cold that the Kentucky River froze to a depth of two feet. The frontier settlements alongside the road struggled to survive. Many of the cattle and hogs froze to death. The settlers had to eat frozen cattle and horses to survive.

They would not attack large groups but wait for weaker ones who were not able to defend themselves. More than 100 men, women and children were killed in the fall of 1784 along the Wilderness Road. Many families, even in ice and snow, crossed the creeks and rivers without shoes or stockings; they often had no money and few clothes. They lived off the land by hunting in the woods and by fishing in the streams.

Since they had hardly any money, entire families sometimes walked hundreds of miles after landing in America. They even used cattle as pack animals to carry their heavy loads. Cabins were built and land was cleared of trees and undergrowth so crops could be planted.

Chestnut was the most popular wood since its logs could be used to build cabins and rail fences to protect crops from wild animals. It could easily be split into shingles for roofs to cover cabins and barns. Its bark was used to make medicine and tannic acid for tanning and dyeing. In the fall, its rich nuts were used to fatten razorback hogs for the market and the home. Hemlock was also highly valued for its many uses.

Commerce and mail
The Wilderness Road served as a great path of commerce for the early settlers in Kentucky, as well as for wagon-loads of slaves being transported through Tennessee to plantations in Mississippi and Louisiana. Horses, cattle, sheep and hogs herded in the other direction found waiting markets in the Carolinas, Maryland and Virginia. Hogs in groups of 500 or more were driven down the Road to market.  Beef in Eastern markets had become a main source of income for farmers in Kentucky.

A postal road was opened in 1792 from Bean Station, Tennessee through Cumberland Gap to Danville, Kentucky.  This was due largely to the efforts of Governor Isaac Shelby of Kentucky.  This connection of Kentucky to the East was a great advantage.  Frontier settlers considered the postal riders heroes and waited eagerly for their arrival for news from settlements along the trails as well as getting their mail and newspapers.

Civil War and decline

Use of the Wilderness Road fell when the National Road was opened in 1818, allowing travel to the Ohio River on more level ground from the East. The Panic of 1837, geology and new railroad technology doomed the James River Canal, once envisioned as augmenting this commercial route. At the same time, the steamboat first appeared on the Ohio and Mississippi Rivers, allowing faster and cheaper travel both up and down the rivers. During the 1850s, the Virginia and Tennessee Railroad was constructed along part of this route.

During the American Civil War, both the Union Army and the Confederate States Army used the Wilderness Road. An early battle (Camp Wildcat), stymied the first Confederate attempt to seize control of neutral Kentucky. The Cumberland Gap changed hands four times throughout the war. Southern troops used the road for marches into Virginia. General Ulysses S. Grant came down the road for the Union campaign in Tennessee in 1864. Grant was so taken by the Road that he said, "With two brigades of the Army of the Cumberland I could hold that pass against the army which Napoleon led to Moscow."

Preservation 

A segment of the Wilderness Road was among the first roads in the United States to be paved. The old road from the town of Cumberland Gap, Tennessee to Middlesboro, Kentucky through the mountain pass was paved and completed on October 3, 1908. This was an "object-lesson" road (a new kind of paved macadam construction funded by local communities but with federal governmental supervision) initiated by the U.S. Office of Public Roads. Its name was later changed to U.S. Route 25E. This new road brought a new industry, tourism, to the rural areas filling hotels and restaurants with travelers.
 
Cumberland Gap is a National Historical Park, and portions of the Wilderness Road can be visited at Wilderness Road State Park in Virginia. Since the completion of the Cumberland Gap Tunnel in 1996, a project has been underway to restore the original appearance of the Wilderness Road as it crosses the historic Cumberland Gap.

The replanting of thousands of seedlings from original forest stocks in the area is intended, over a period of decades, to recreate a forest that will allow visitors to view the crossing of the Gap on the Wilderness Road as travelers would have experienced it circa 1790. This section of the Wilderness Road is now a hiking trail, including an interpretive center about the road's history located on the Tennessee side.

See also
Kentucky County, Virginia
Ohio Country
Overmountain Men
Southwest Territory
Trans-Appalachia

Footnotes

References
 Axelrod, Alan: What Every American Should Know About American History (1992)  Holbrook, MA.  Adams Media Corp. . 
 Bodett, Tom: America's Historic Trails (1992) San Francisco  James Connoly (Small World Productions).  
 Calloway, Brenda: America's First Western Frontier: East Tennessee (1989) Kingsport, Tenn. The Overmountain Press  . 
 Cooke, Alistair: Alistair Cooke's America (1973) New York Alfred A. Knopf, Inc.  
 Eslinger, Ellen: Running Mad for Kentucky: Frontier Travel Accounts. University Press of Kentucky, (2004).  
 Drake, Richard B. A History of Appalachia. University Press of Kentucky (2001). 
 Kincaid, Robert: The Wilderness Road (1992) Kingsport, Tenn.  Arcata Graphics. ISBN Unknown  
 Leyburn, James G: The Scotch Irish A Social History (1962) Chapel Hill .University of North Carolina Press . . 
 Newby, Eric: The Rand McNally World Atlas of Exploration (1975) London: Mitchell Beazley. . 
 Riley, Darnell: The Tennessee Blue Book (2004) Nashville: State of Tennessee. 
 Rouse, Parke, Jr: 'The Great Wagon Road (2004) Richmond: The Diaz Press . . 
 Webb, James: Born Fighting How the Scots-Irish Shaped America (2004) New York : Broadway Books. .
 Williams, John Alexander: Appalachia: A History'' (2002) Chapel Hill, N.C. : University of North Carolina Press. .

External links
 Interactive map of the Wilderness Road
 Map of the Kentucky part of the Wilderness Road
 The Wilderness Road Regional Museum in Dublin, Virginia, is owned and operated by the New River Historical Society.

Native American trails in the United States
Historic trails and roads in the United States
Historic trails and roads in Kentucky
Historic trails and roads in Tennessee
Historic trails and roads in Virginia
Daniel Boone
National Scenic Byways
U.S. Route 25
Appalachia
Native American history of Kentucky
Native American history of Tennessee
Native American history of Virginia